The Lithuanian Popular Peasants' Union (LVLS) was a centre-left political party in Lithuania between 1922 and 1936. The party's leaders included the third President Kazys Grinius and three-term Prime Minister Mykolas Sleževičius.

History
The party was established in November 1922 by a merger of the Lithuanian Popular Socialist Democratic Party and the Peasant Union. At the time the two parties held a combined 19 seats, making it the largest in the Seimas. The new party emerged as the largest faction in the 1923 elections, winning 16 of the 78 seats. The 1926 elections saw the party increase its seat tally to 22, remaining the largest party in the Seimas.

The LVLS formed a coalition government with the Social Democratic Party, but it was overthrown by a military coup in December 1926 which installed the Lithuanian Nationalist Union as the ruling party. The LVLS was banned in 1936.

References

Further reading

Banned political parties
Defunct political parties in Lithuania
Political parties established in 1922
Political parties disestablished in 1936